GUSD may refer to:

 Goleta Union School District
 Glendale Unified School District
 Ganado Unified School District
 Gridley Unified School District